Jerry O'Riordan (1939 – 29 December 2020) was an Irish Gaelic footballer. At club level he played with Glenbeigh-Glencar and divisional side Mid Kerry and was an All-Ireland Championship winner with the Kerry senior football team.

Playing career

Born in Glenbeigh, O'Riordan first enjoyed success at club level in 1956 when he won a Mid Kerry Championship title. He won three more divisional titles in a club career that lasted 20 years, as well as a County Championship title with Mid Kerry in 1967. O'Riordan made his first appearance for the Kerry senior football team in the first round of the 1961-62 league, ending his debut season by winning an All-Ireland Championship medal after lining out at right wing-forward in the final against Roscommon. He also won back-to-back Munster Championship medals before playing his last game in the fourth round of the 1964-65 league.

Honours

Glenbeigh-Glencar
Mid Kerry Senior Football Championship (4): 1956, 1964, 1974, 1975

Mid Kerry
Kerry Senior Football Championship (1): 1967

Kerry
All-Ireland Senior Football Championship (1): 1962
Munster Senior Football Championship (2): 1962, 1963

References

External link

 Jerry O'Riordan profile at the Terrace Talk website

1939 births
2020 deaths
Glenbeigh-Glencar Gaelic footballers
Kerry inter-county Gaelic footballers